Post of North Macedonia (Macedonian: Пошта на Северна Македонија) is the company responsible for postal service in North Macedonia. It was founded on 1 June 1992.

See also 
 Postal codes in North Macedonia

References

External links 
 Official site

Communications in North Macedonia
Companies of North Macedonia
Macedonia
Brands of North Macedonia